The oratory Teampall Bheanáin  (meaning "Benan's Temple") is situated near Kilronan on Inishmore, Aran, Galway Bay, Ireland. A unique example of Celtic church construction. It marks the location of the original monastic settlement founded by Benen, a disciple of St. Patrick, the national saint of Ireland. It dates from the 11th century, and has stood unaltered a thousand years.

It is not a conventional church in the sense of its ability to hold a congregation. It is reasonably assumed to be the tomb-shrine of the saint. This ensured its survival when the adjacent round tower and medieval monastery were recycled to fortify the now-ruined Cromwellian coastal fortress nearby.

The oratory is situated high on a ridge, which dominates the windward southeast sea approach to the main island port. Roofless and with unusually high squared gables it cuts a striking, almost oriental silhouette against the skyline, even though internally it measures a tiny 3.2 m  x 2.1 m. It is formed from massive blocks of stone (a single slab forms a half of one side), and is bonded by mortar and very careful fitting. Its thick walls are pierced by a traveated (three beam) narrow north doorway with inclining jambs, and cut away lintel. A small east window with a single stone semi-circular head keeps a vigil towards the mainland of Ireland. The altar faces south rather than east/west which is the usual position, though the symbolism of this is not known.

References
 Habitual Masonry Styles and Local Organisation of Church Building in Early Medieval Ireland Tomás ó Carragáin, Dept. of Archaeology, UCC 2005
 Saints and Shrines of Aran Mor - C.Scantlebury S.J.

Buildings and structures in County Galway
Religion in County Galway
National Monuments in County Galway
Roman Catholic chapels in the Republic of Ireland